Tyler Lee Hamilton (born 5 January 1999) is an English professional footballer.

Club career

Hull City 
Hamilton joined Hull City at the age of eight and signed a scholarship in July 2016. On 22 August 2017, he made his debut in a 2–0 EFL Cup defeat to Doncaster Rovers.
On 28 February 2018, Hamilton signed a two-year contract with the club.

Hartlepool United (loan) 
On 6 December 2019, Hamilton went on a month-long loan to Hartlepool United, this was later extended for a further month. Hamilton's loan was cut short on 30 January 2020 due to issues with his contract at Hull City. On 31 January 2020, Hamilton's contract with Hull City was terminated by mutual consent.

Gainsborough Trinity
On 29 September 2020, Hamilton signed for Gainsborough Trinity.

North Ferriby
On 17 March 2021, Hamilton registered with North Ferriby.

Statistics

References 

1999 births
Living people
English footballers
Association football midfielders
Hull City A.F.C. players
Hartlepool United F.C. players
Gainsborough Trinity F.C. players